Narasimhudu is a 2005 Indian Telugu-language action film directed by B. Gopal. The film stars Jr. NTR, Amisha Patel, and Sameera Reddy. The film is a remake of 2004 Kannada film Durgi directed by P. Ravi Shankar. The film was a disaster at the box office.

Plot
Narasimhudu (NTR)'s parents die at a young age and he is adopted by the villagers of Kondaveedu, who all take up the responsibility of bringing him up. The son of JD (Puneet Issar) and brother of Pothuraju (Kalabhavan Mani) rape an 11-year-old in the village. Narasimhudu who is also the caretaker of the village, vows to take revenge on the big people and their sons for committing the heinous crime. The rest is how Narasimhudu kills them.

Cast
Jr. NTR as Narasimhudu
Sameera Reddy as Narasimhudu love interest
Amisha Patel as Subbalakshmi
Puneet Issar as JD
Kalabhavan Mani as Pothuraju
Rahul Dev as JD's son
Ashish Vidyarthi as Police Commissioner
Brahmanandam as Narasimhudu friend 
Tanikella Bharani as Doctor
Jaya Prakash Reddy as MLA
Krishna Bhagawan as Pothuraju's sidekick
Chalapathi Rao as Narasimhudu's side (Master Ji)
Ali as Narasimhudu's friend
Venu Madhav as Venu
G. V. Sudhakar Naidu as Kaali
Chitram Seenu as Sreenu
Aarti Agarwal as an item number

Soundtrack

Music Was composed by Mani Sharma and released on Aditya Music Company. Audio was launched on 23 April 2005 at a grand Function held at Taj Residency, Hyderabad. N. Chandrababu Naidu V. V. Vinayak and many other celebrities attended the function.

Reception 
B. Anuradha of Rediff.com called the film a "huge disappointment" and added "Gopal [..] is fascinated with a formula of attractively picturised songs, big action scenes, punchlines and comedy, but fails to pick the right plot."

Sify gave the film 3/5 and wrote "Narasimhudu is one of those insufferable movies, that is devoid of a basic story and there is nothing new in style or presentation."  Idlebrain.com's Jeevi rated the film 2.5/5 and wrote "Movie starts off in an interesting style with a good introduction of the hero. But this graph slides down as the movie progress."

References

External links
 

2005 films
2000s Telugu-language films
Telugu remakes of Kannada films
2000s masala films
Indian films about revenge
Films directed by B. Gopal
Films scored by Mani Sharma